There are a few places in Maine named Lincoln:

Lincoln, Maine, a town of 5,200
Lincoln (CDP), Maine, a census-designated place in the town
Lincoln Plantation, Maine, in Oxford County